John 20:23 is the twenty-third verse of the twentieth chapter of the Gospel of John in the New Testament. It records Jesus giving the power of forgiveness to the disciples during his first appearance after the resurrection.

Content
The original Koine Greek, according to the Textus Receptus, reads:

In the King James Version of the Bible it is translated as:
Whose soever sins ye remit, they are remitted unto them; and whose soever sins ye retain, they are retained.

The modern World English Bible translates the passage as:
Whoever's sins you forgive, they are forgiven them. Whoever's sins you retain, they have been retained."

For a collection of other versions see BibleHub John 20:23

Analysis
The account of Jesus' first appearance in the Gospel of John (20:19-23) shows similarity to the account in the Gospel of Luke, that it happened in Jerusalem in the evening of his resurrection from the dead.

Jesus' promise here is given to the whole group of disciples (the verb is plural), parallel to the promise in Matthew 16:19; Matthew 18:18. The disciples' power to forgive sins is linked to the gift of the Spirit in John 20:22, and not in human power. The verbs for forgiving and retaining are in the passive form, indicating that God is the one in action.

With the statement in this verse, Jesus declares that in his messianic community (the "new covenant") his followers ("Christians") now hold the key to membership, in contrast to the authority held by the Jewish leadership (represented by the Sanhedrin and the Pharisees at that time) to affirm or deny acceptance in the synagogues (the "old covenant").

John 20:23 is seen as the origin for the practice of Confession and Absolution by the Catholic Church, Lutheran Churches, Anglican Communion, Eastern Orthodox Churches, Oriental Orthodox Churches, Assyrian Church of the East, and Irvingian Churches. These Christian denominations teach that the Church has been given the apostolic power to forgive sins.

See also
Keys of the kingdom
Power of the Keys

References

Sources

External links
Jesus Appears to His Disciples

20:23
John 20:23